Mulikipalle is a village in Razole Mandal, East Godavari district in the state of Andhra Pradesh in India.

Geography 

Demographics 
 India census, Mulikipalle had a population of 1206, out of which 3884 were male and 1262 were female. The population of children below 6 years of age was 10%. The literacy rate of the village was 79%.

References 

Villages in Razole mandal